Freak Guitar: The Smorgasbord is a double-disc studio album by Mattias IA Eklundh, released on Steve Vai's Favored Nations label on 5 March 2013. It features close to two hours of eclectic, mostly instrumental guitar music, with a variety of influences.

Reception
The album was reviewed in the April 2013 issue of Guitarist magazine, where it was given 4.5 stars out of 5 and recommended for fans of Vai and Frank Zappa. Total Guitar gave it 4 stars out of 5.

Guests performers
The album features a number of guest musicians, including:
 Ron "Bumblefoot" Thal – solo on "Special Agent Bauer"
 V. Selvaganesh – kanjira on "Kali Ghat", "Those in Badiyah", "Mandur and Morgan's Camel Safari", "Friedrichs Wahnbriefe"
 Dweezil Zappa – solo on "Mind Your Step (at Schiphol Airport)"
 Andy Timmons – first and fourth solos on "Peter, I Won't Drive Another Meter"; solo on "Those in Badiyah"
 Guthrie Govan – second and fifth solos on "Peter, I Won't Drive Another Meter"
 Kiko Loureiro – third and sixth solos on "Peter, I Won't Drive Another Meter"
 Jan Laney – "Peter, I won't Drive Another Meter"
 Björn Fryklund – drums on "The Smorgasbord", "Crossing the Rubicon", "Peter, I Won't Drive Another Meter", "In the Goo of the Evening"
 Serge Levaillant – vocals on "Mattias – The Beautiful Guy"
 Jonas Hellborg – bass on "Kali Ghat"
 Gabriel Eklundh – screams and various vocal sounds throughout "Blaha Blaha"
 Kevin Fickling – vocals on "Special Agent Bauer"
 Morgan Ågren – drums, percussion on "Meralgia Paresthetica"
 Zac O'Yeah – zombie grunts on "Mandur and Morgan's Camel Safari"
 Ranjit Barot – drums on "Keep It in the Dojo"
 Fredrik Thordendal – solo on "Friedrichs Wahnbriefe"

Track listing

CD1
 "Amphibians Night Out" – 3:32
 "Musth" – 3:12
 "Mattias – The Beautiful Guy" – 2:27
 "Hells Bells" – 3:40
 "The Smorgasbord" – 2:52
 "Friedrichs Wahnbriefe" – 3:08
 "Sexually Frustrated Fruit Fly Flamenco" – 0:41
 "Daily Grind Disco March" – 2:46
 "Lease sith an Option to Buy" – 2:23
 "The Swede and the Wolf" – 4:20
 "Mambo Italiano" – 2:18
 "Mind Your Step (at Schiphol Airport)" – 3:34
 "Crossing the Rubicon" – 7:48
 "That's Amore" – 2:27
 "Keep it in the Dojo" – 2:41
 "Infrared Jed" – 0:33
 "Peter, I Won't Drive Another Meter" – 4:35
 "Larvatus Prodeo" – 1:15
 "Blaha Blaha" – 2:31
 "Lullaby for Gabriel" – 2:25

CD2
 "In the Goo of the Evening" – 3:12
 "The Dogs of Delhi" – 2:16
 "Special Agent Bauer" – 2:07
 "Mahavishnu John" – 3:34
 "The Harry Lime Theme" – 1:28
 "Dark Matter" – 2:48
 "Trumpet Lesson" – 0:53
 "Mandur and Morgan's Camel Safari" – 3:13
 "Shore Thing" – 2:14
 "Captain Smith's Moment of Truth" – 1:35
 "Mah Nà Mah Nà" – 2:39
 "The Nigerian Gynecologist" – 3:25
 "6 Rue Cordot" – 1:17
 "Kali Ghat" – 4:37
 "Safe to Remove Hardware" – 1:30
 "Did You Actually Pay for That?" – 2:45
 "Those in Badiyah" – 3:46
 "The Essence of Emptiness" – 4:37
 "Meralgia Paresthetica" – 4:51
 "Guano Afternoon" – 1:46

Credits
All songs are written by Mattias IA Eklundh, except the following:
 "Hells Bells" – Angus Young, Malcolm Young, Brian Johnson
 "Mambo Italiano" – Bob Merrill
 "That's Amore" – Harry Warren, Jack Brooks
 "The Harry Lime Theme" – Anton Karas
 "Mandur and Morgan's Camel Safari" – music by Eklundh, lyrics by Eklundh and Zac O'Yeah
 "Mah Nà Mah Nà" – Piero Umiliani
 "Kali Ghat" – Jonas Hellborg, V. Selvaganesh
 "Those in Badiyah" – Jonas Hellborg, V. Selvaganesh, Eklundh

References

External links
 Official Freak Guitar website

2013 albums